Haji Saifullah Khan Bangash was a Pakistani politician who has been a member of Senate of Pakistan, from March 2012 to February 2018.

Education
He received Matriculation level education from Government High School, Kohat in 1970.

Political career
He was elected to the Senate of Pakistan as a candidate of Pakistan Peoples Party in 2012 Pakistani Senate election.

He remained Senator until his death on 1 February 2018 due to heart failure at the age of 70.

References

Year of birth missing
20th-century births
2018 deaths
Pakistani senators (14th Parliament)
Pakistan People's Party politicians